Hypolycaena ogadenensis is a butterfly in the family Lycaenidae. It was described by Henri Stempffer in 1946. It is found in Ethiopia.

References

Endemic fauna of Ethiopia
Butterflies described in 1946
Hypolycaenini